The Roman Catholic Diocese of Cayenne (Latin: Dioecesis Caiennensis; French: Diocèse de Cayenne) (erected 1651, as the Prefecture Apostolic of French Guiana-Cayenne) is a suffragan diocese of the Archdiocese of Fort-de-France. It was elevated on to the Vicariate Apostolic of French Guiana-Cayenne on 10 January 1933 and to the Diocese of Cayenne on 29 February 1956. The seat of the bishop is in Cayenne Cathedral.

Ordinaries
Giustino Fabre (1923–1924)
Leone Delaval, C.S.Sp. (1925–1932)
Pierre-Marie Gourtay, C.S.Sp. (1933–1944)
Alfred Aimé Léon Marie, C.S.Sp. (1945–1973)
François-Marie Morvan, C.S.Sp. (1973–1998)
Louis Albert Joseph Roger Sankalé (1998–2004), appointed Coadjutor Bishop of Nice
Emmanuel Lafont (2004–2020)
Alain Ransay (2021–present)

See also
List of Roman Catholic dioceses in South America

External links and references
Eglise Catholique De Guyane, Diocese De Cayenne official site

Roman Catholic dioceses in South America
1651 establishments in the French colonial empire
Roman Catholic Ecclesiastical Province of Fort-de-France